Don't Drop the Soap is a controversial prison-themed board game designed by art student John Sebelius as a 2006 class project at the Rhode Island School of Design. The game received criticism for its content, most notably for the game's treatment of prison rape. Sebelius also received notice for being the son of Secretary of Health and Human Services Kathleen Sebelius and U.S. Magistrate Judge K. Gary Sebelius. The game officially went on sale on January 31, 2008 in Lawrence, Kansas and through Sebelius' personal website, and is considered to be similar to Monopoly in its gameplay.

Gameplay
The gameplay consists of six levels and can be played by up to three people. Users can choose to play as Sal "The Butcher", "Anferny", or "Wheelz", a disabled prisoner. The ultimate goal of the game is for the player to make parole without dropping the soap in the prison shower. If a prisoner "drops the soap", they must return to the beginning of the game.

Reaction
The National Prison Rape Elimination Commission, a U.S. bipartisan panel aimed at curbing prison rape, criticized the game and stated that the title made light of "a serious and all-too-pervasive violent sex crime." The Pitch criticized Sebelius, labelling him "The Idiot Son of an Elected Official." Politician Tim Huelskamp requested that the game be investigated and voiced concerns that the game was being marketed and stored at Cedar Crest, the Governor's mansion.

Sebelius responded to the criticism, explaining that he meant for the game to be a lighthearted spoof and was not an endorsement of prison rape.

See also
 List of board games

References

Board games introduced in 2008
Roll-and-move board games
Lawrence, Kansas
Prison rape